Grupo Desportivo Riopele was a Portuguese football club founded in 1958 from Vila Nova de Famalicão, Braga. It only currently maintains the junior divisions open to focus on youth football development. The club have played once in the Primeira Liga which was in the 1977–78 season were the club was relegated following one season. The club's most notable former players include Jorge Jesus and José Romão.

References

External links
 ZeroZero profile & stats
 ForaDeJogo.net profile & stats
 WorldFootball.net profile

Football clubs in Portugal
Association football clubs established in 1958
1958 establishments in Portugal
Primeira Liga clubs
association football clubs disestablished in 1985
Defunct football clubs in Portugal